A Media Aggregation Platform or Media Aggregation Portal (MAP) is an over the top service for distributing web-based streaming media content from multiple sources to a large audience. MAPs consist of networks of sources who host their own content which viewers can choose and access directly from a larger variety of content to choose from than a single source can offer. The service is used by content providers, looking to extend the reach of their content.

Unlike multichannel video programming distributor (MVPD) or multiple-system operator (MSO), MAPs rely on the Internet rather than cables or satellite. As more network television channels have moved online in the early 21st century, joining web-native channels like Netflix, MAPs aggregates content the way that MSOs and MVPDs have used cable, and to a lesser extent satellite and IPTV infrastructure. There are companies that offer a similar service for free, including Yidio and StreamingMoviesRight, while others charge a subscription fee like as FreeCast Inc's Rabbit TV Plus. When compared with MSOs and MVPDs, MPAs network have much lower cost due to lack of physical infrastructure. The majority of revenues from their services is retained by the content creators and revenues are from advertisements, pay-per-view, and subscription-based content offerings instead of by licensing and reselling content. MAPs service consumers directly with the content source and they purchase content directly from its source, without the markup added by a middleman.

See also
 Broadcast networks 
 Internet Protocol television (IPTV)
 Multichannel video programming distributor (MVPD)
 Multiple system operator (MSO)
 Over-the-air (OTA)
 Over-the-top (OTT)
 Pay TV
 Streaming Media
 Streaming television
 Video on demand (VOD)

References

Data management